Anthology Recordings is the reissue imprint of the independent record label, Mexican Summer. The label was originally founded by Mexican Summer A&R man, Keith Abrahamsson, in 2004, and has reissued records from artists such as Trad Gras Och Stenar, Linda Perhacs, and Rüdiger Lorenz, among others.

In 2016, Anthology Recordings expanded its repertoire, and began publishing books under the imprint, Anthology Editions. The books of Anthology Editions typically center on music-related or counter-cultural subject matter, and feature contributions by Lou Reed, Joan E. Biren, Jonas Mekas, Jerry Hsu, Dennis Stock and more.

Reissues by Anthology Recordings
 Bernard Fèvre — Suspense (2012)
 Morning of the Earth — Morning of the Earth OST (2014)
 Crystal Voyager — Crystal Voyager OST (2014)
 Creation Rebel / New Age Steppers — Threat to Creation (2014)
 Robert Lester Folsom — Ode to a Rainy Day: Archives 1972–1975 (2014)
 Robert Lester Folsom — Music and Dreams (2014)
 The Stroke Band — Green and Yellow (2014)
 Bali High — Bali High OST (2014)
 Andrew Kidman — Litmus (2015)
 Andrew Kidman — Glass Love (2015)
 Bernard Fèvre — Cosmos 2043 (2015)
 Michael Angelo — Michael Angelo (2015)
 Rudiger Lorenz — Invisible Voices (2015)
 Black Devil Disco Club — Black Devil Disco Club (2015)
 Tully — Sea of Joy (2016)
 Ilian — Love Me Crazy (2015)
 Tamam Shud — Evolution (2016)
 Trad Gras Och Stenar — Mors Mors (2016)
 Trad Gras Och Stenar — Djungens Lag (2016)
 Various Artists — Follow the Sun (2017)
 F.J. McMahon — Spirit of the Golden Juice (2017)
 Pharoah Sanders — Tauhid (2017)
 Pharoah Sanders — Jewels of Thought (2017)
 Pharoah Sanders — Summun Bukmun Umyun - Deaf Dumb Blind (2017)
 Various Artists — Paul Major: Feel the Music Vol. 1 (2017)
 The Nightcrawlers — The Biophonic Boombox Recordings (2018)
 Norma Tanega — I'm the Sky: Studio and Demo Recordings, 1964–1971 (2022)

Books published by Anthology Editions
 Jack Womack — Flying Saucers are Real (2016)
 Johan Kugelberg with Jon Savage and Glen Terry — God Save Sex Pistols (2016)
 Tino Razo — Party in the Back (2017)
 Peter Coffin — Imaginary Concerts (2017)
 Jonh Ingham — Spirit of 76: London Punk Eyewitness (2017)
 Paul Major with Johan Kugelberg and Mark Iosifescu — Feel the Music: The Psychedelic Worlds of Paul Major (2017)
 Jonas Mekas — A Dance with Fred Astaire (2017)
 Peter Watts — Altered States: The Library of Julio Santo Domingo (2017)
 Peter Coffin — Imaginary Concerts Volume Two (2018)
 Lou Reed — Do Angels Need Haircuts? (2018)
 David Hollander — Unusual Sounds: The Hidden History of Library Music (2018)
 Matthew Craven - Primer (2018)
 Jane Dickson - Jane Dickson in Times Square (2018)
 Joe Roberts - We Ate the Acid (2018)
 CF - Pierrot Alterations (2018)
 Jerry Hsu - The Beautiful Flower is the World (2019)
 Natalie Anne Howard - From Gardens Where We Feel Secure (2019)
 Brian Blomerth - Brian Blomerth's Bicycle Day (2019)
 Grace Srinivasiah and Alex Tults - Crude Intentions (2019)
 Dennis Stock - California Trip - Reissue (2019)
 Jonathan Higbee - Coincidences (2019)
 Ed Emshwiller - Dream Dance: The Art of Ed Emshwiller (2019)
 Akasha Rabut - Death Magick Abundance (2020)
 Paul Drummond - 13th Floor Elevators: A Visual History (2020)
 Tim Presley - Under the Banner of Concern (2020)
 CF - William Softkey and the Purple Spider (2020)
 Lavender Suarez - Transcendent Waves: How Listening Shapes Our Creative Lives (2020)
 JEB (Joan E. Biren) - Eye to Eye: Portraits of Lesbians - Reissue (2020)

References

Reissue record labels
Record labels established in 2004